Cuvântul (meaning "The Word") was a daily newspaper, published by philosopher Nae Ionescu in Bucharest, Romania, from 1926 to 1934, and again in 1938. It was primarily noted for progressively adopting a far right and fascist agenda, and for supporting, during the 1930s, the revolutionary fascist Iron Guard.

References

Newspapers published in Bucharest
Romanian-language newspapers
Fascist newspapers and magazines
Iron Guard
Publications established in 1926
Publications disestablished in 1938